The 1980 All-Big Ten Conference football team consists of American football players chosen by various organizations for All-Big Ten Conference teams for the 1980 college football season.

Offensive selections

Quarterbacks
 Mark Herrmann, Purdue (AP-1; UPI-1)
 Art Schlichter, Ohio State (AP-2; UPI-2)

Running backs
 Calvin Murray, Ohio State (AP-1; UPI-1)
 Marion Barber, Jr., Minnesota (AP-1; UPI-2)
 Garry White, Minnesota (UPI-1)
 Stan Edwards, Michigan (AP-2; UPI-2)

Wide receivers
 Anthony Carter, Michigan (AP-1; UPI-1 [split end])
 Doug Donley, Ohio State (AP-1; UPI-1 [split end])
 Bart Burrell, Purdue (AP-2; UPI-2 [split end])
 Keith Chapelle, Iowa (AP-2; UPI-2 [split end])
 Todd Sheets, Northwestern (AP-2)

Tight ends
 Dave Young, Purdue (AP-1; UPI-1)
 Bob Stephenson, Indiana (UPI-2)

Centers
 George Lilja, Michigan (AP-1; UPI-1)
 Jay Hilgenberg, Iowa (UPI-2)

Guards
 Joe Lukens, Ohio State (AP-1; UPI-1)
 Kurt Becker, Michigan (AP-1; UPI-2)
 John Powers, Michigan (UPI-1)
 Rod Strata, Michigan State (UPI-2)

Tackles
 Ed Muransky, Michigan (AP-1; UPI-1)
 Bubba Paris, Michigan (AP-1; UPI-1)
 Luther Henson, Ohio State (UPI-2)
 Gerhard Ahting, Indiana (UPI-2)

Defensive selections

Defensive linemen
 Calvin Clark, Purdue (AP-1; UPI-1)
 Mike Trgovac, Michigan (AP-1; UPI-1)
 Jerome Foster, Ohio State (AP-1; UPI-2)
 Tim Krumrie, Wisconsin (AP-1)
 Jeff Schuh, Minnesota (AP-1; UPI-2)
 John Harty, Iowa (UPI-1)
 Mel Owens, Michigan (UPI-1)
 Dave Ahdrens, Wisconsin (UPI-2)
 Andre Tippett, Iowa (UPI-2)

Linebackers
 Andy Cannavino, Michigan (AP-1; UPI-1)
 Marcus Marek, Ohio State (AP-1; UPI-1)
 Jim Looney, Purdue (AP-1)
 Marlin Evans, Indiana (UPI-1)
 Tom Kingsbury, Purdue (AP-2; UPI-2)
 Dave Ahrens, Wisconsin (AP-2)
 Andre Tippett, Iowa (AP-2)
 Pat Dean, Iowa (UPI-2)
 John Gillen, Illinois (UPI-2)

Defensive backs
 Ray Ellis, Ohio State (AP-1; UPI-1)
 Tim Wilbur, Indiana (AP-1; UPI-1)
 Bill Kay, Purdue (AP-1; UPI-2)
 Vince Skillings, Ohio State (UPI-1)
 Todd Bell, Ohio State (UPI-1)
 Keith Bostic, Michigan (UPI-2)
 Tony Jackson, Michigan (UPI-2)

Special teams

Placekicker
 Vlade Janakievski, Ohio State (AP-1; UPI-1)
 Morten Andersen, Michigan State (UPI-2)

Punter
 Ray Stachowicz, Michigan State (AP-1; UPI-1)
 Tom Orosz, Ohio State (UPI-2)

Key
AP = Associated Press, selected by the AP's media panel

UPI - United Press International

See also
1980 College Football All-America Team

References

All-Big Ten Conference
All-Big Ten Conference football teams